The 2022 Clemson Tigers women's soccer team represented Clemson University during the 2022 NCAA Division I women's soccer season.  The Tigers were led by head coach Ed Radwanski, in his twelfth season.  The Tigers home games were played at Riggs Field.  This was be the team's 29th season playing organized soccer, and all of those seasons were played in the Atlantic Coast Conference.

The team finished 8–5–5 overall and 4–3–3 in ACC play to finish in seventh place. The loss cased them to fall out of the rankings, but they followed it up with a draw at #4  in a rivalry match. Wins over then #17  and #6 Notre Dame propelled them to #14 in the rankings. However, the team then went on a three game losing streak which saw them fall back out of the rankings. The Tigers played three more ranked teams during the season, beating #24 Virginia Tech and drawing with #10 Duke and #19 Pittsburgh.

They did not qualify for the ACC Tournament, finishing one spot outside of the six teams that qualified.  They received an at-large invitation to the NCAA Tournament where they were a five-seed in the UCLA Bracket and hosted  in the First Round.  They lost the game 0–1 to end their season.  Their eight wins was their lowest total since 2013.

Previous season

The Tigers finished the season 12–7–1 and 6–3–1 in ACC play to finish in fifth place.  As the fifth seed in the ACC Tournament, they defeated Notre Dame before falling to Virginia in the Semifinals.  They earned an at-large bid to the NCAA Tournament, where they lost to Alabama in the First Round to end their season.

Offseason

Departures

Incoming Transfers

Recruiting Class

Source:

Squad

Roster

Team management

Source:

Schedule

Source:

|-
!colspan=6 style=""| Exhibition

|-
!colspan=6 style=""| Non-Conference Regular Season

|-
!colspan=6 style=""| ACC Regular Season

|-
!colspan=6 style=""| NCAA Tournament

Goals Record

Disciplinary record

Awards and honors

Rankings

References

External links

Clemson
2021
Clemson Women's Soccer
Clemson
Clemson